A cenote ( or) is a natural pit, or sinkhole, resulting from the collapse of limestone bedrock that exposes groundwater. The regional term is specifically associated with the Yucatán Peninsula of Mexico, where cenotes were commonly used for water supplies by the ancient Maya, and occasionally for sacrificial offerings. The term derives from a word used by the lowland Yucatec Maya——to refer to any location with accessible groundwater.

The Yucatán Peninsula has an estimated 10,000 cenotes, water-filled sinkholes naturally formed by the collapse of limestone, located across the Yucatán Peninsula, in Mexico. Some of these cenotes are at risk from the construction of the new tourist Maya Train.

Similar rock-sided sinkholes like cenotes are common geological forms in low-altitude regions, particularly on islands, coastlines, and platforms with young post-Paleozoic limestone with little soil development. The term cenote has also been used to describe similar karst features in other countries such as Cuba and Australia.

Definition and description

Cenotes are surface connections to subterranean water bodies. While the best-known cenotes are large open-water pools measuring tens of meters in diameter, such as those at Chichen Itza in Mexico, the greatest number of cenotes are smaller sheltered sites and do not necessarily have any surface exposed water. Some cenotes are only found through small <1 m (3 ft) diameter holes created by tree roots, with human access through enlarged holes, such as the cenotes Cenote Choo-Ha, Tamcach-Ha, and Multum-Ha near Tulum. There are at least 6,000 cenotes in the Yucatán Peninsula of Mexico. Cenote water is often very clear, as the water comes from rain water filtering slowly through the ground, and therefore contains very little suspended particulate matter. The groundwater flow rate within a cenote may be very slow.

Geology and hydrology

Cenotes are formed by the dissolution of rock and the resulting subsurface void, which may or may not be linked to an active cave system, and the subsequent structural collapse. Rock that falls into the water below is slowly removed by further dissolution, creating space for more collapse blocks. Likely, the rate of collapse increases during periods when the water table is below the ceiling of the void since the rock ceiling is no longer buoyantly supported by the water in the void.

Cenotes may be fully collapsed, creating an open water pool, or partially collapsed with some portion of a rock overhanging above the water. The stereotypical cenotes often resemble small circular ponds, measuring some tens of meters in diameter with sheer rock walls. Most cenotes, however, require some degree of stooping or crawling to access the water.

Penetration and extent

However, very few of these cenotes appear to be connected with horizontally extensive underground river systems, with water flow through them being more likely dominated by aquifer matrix and fracture flows.

In contrast, the cenotes along the Caribbean coast of the Yucatán Peninsula (within the state of Quintana Roo) often provide access to extensive underwater cave systems, such as Sistema Ox Bel Ha, Sistema Sac Actun/Sistema Nohoch Nah Chich and Sistema Dos Ojos.

Freshwater/seawater interface
The Yucatán Peninsula contains a vast coastal aquifer system, which is typically density-stratified. The infiltrating meteoric water (i.e., rainwater) floats on top of higher-density saline water intruding from the coastal margins. The whole aquifer is therefore an anchialine system (one that is land-locked but connected to an ocean). Where a cenote, or the flooded cave to which it is an opening, provides deep enough access into the aquifer, the interface between the fresh and saline water may be reached. The density interface between the fresh and saline waters is a halocline, which means a sharp change in salt concentration over a small change in depth. Mixing of the fresh and saline water results in a blurry swirling effect caused by refraction between the different densities of fresh and saline waters.

The depth of the halocline is a function of several factors: climate and specifically how much meteoric water recharges the aquifer, hydraulic conductivity of the host rock, distribution and connectivity of existing cave systems, and how effective these are at draining water to the coast, and the distance from the coast.

Types
In 1936, a simple morphometry-based classification system for cenotes was presented.
 Cenotes-cántaro (Jug or pit cenotes) are those with a surface connection narrower than the diameter of the water body;
 Cenotes-cilíndricos (Cylinder cenotes) are those with strictly vertical walls;
 Cenotes-aguadas (Basin cenotes) are those with shallow water basins; and
 Grutas (Cave cenotes) are those having a horizontal entrance with dry sections.

The classification scheme was based on morphometric observations above the water table, and therefore incompletely reflects the processes by which the cenotes formed and the inherent hydrogeochemical relationship with the underlying flooded cave networks, which were only discovered in the 1980s and later with the initiation of cave diving exploration.

Flora and fauna 
Flora and fauna are generally scarcer than in the open ocean; however, marine animals do thrive in caves. In caverns, one can spot mojarras, mollies, guppies, catfish, small eels and frogs. In the most secluded and darker cenotes, the fauna has evolved to resemble those of many cave-dwelling species. For example, many animals don't have pigmentation and are often blind, so they are equipped with long feelers to find food and make their way around in the dark.

Chicxulub crater

Although cenotes are found widely throughout much of the Yucatán Peninsula, a higher-density circular alignment of cenotes overlies the measured rim of the Chicxulub crater. This crater structure, identified from the alignment of cenotes, but also subsequently mapped using geophysical methods (including gravity mapping) and also drilled into with core recovery, has been dated to the boundary between the Cretaceous and Paleogene geologic periods, 66 million years ago. This meteorite impact at the Cretaceous–Paleogene boundary is therefore associated with the mass extinction of the dinosaurs and is also known as the Cretaceous–Paleogene extinction event.

Archaeology and anthropology
In 2001–2002 expeditions led by Arturo H. González and Carmen Rojas Sandoval in the Yucatán discovered three human skeletons; one of them, Eve of Naharon, was carbon-dated to be 13,600 years old. In March 2008, three members of the Proyecto Espeleológico de Tulum and Global Underwater Explorers dive team, Alex Alvarez, Franco Attolini, and Alberto Nava, explored a section of Sistema Aktun Hu (part of Sistema Sac Actun) known as the pit Hoyo Negro. At a depth of  the divers located the remains of a mastodon and a human skull (at ) that might be the oldest evidence of human habitation in the region.

The Yucatán Peninsula has almost no rivers and only a few lakes, and those are often marshy. The widely distributed cenotes are the only perennial source of potable water and have long been the principal source of water in much of the region. Major Maya settlements required access to adequate water supplies, and therefore cities, including the famous Chichen Itza, were built around these natural wells. Many cenotes like the Sacred Cenote in Chichen Itza played an important role in Maya rites. The Maya believed that cenotes were portals to Xibalba or the afterlife, and home to the rain god, Chac. The Maya often deposited human remains as well as ceremonial artifacts in these cenotes.

The discovery of golden sacrificial artifacts in some cenotes led to the archaeological exploration of most cenotes in the first part of the 20th century. Edward Herbert Thompson (1857–1935), an American diplomat who had bought the Chichen Itza site, began dredging the Sacred Cenote there in 1904. He discovered human skeletons and sacrificial objects confirming a local legend, the Cult of the Cenote, involving human sacrifice to the rain god Chaac by the ritual casting of victims and objects into the cenote. However, not all cenotes were sites of human sacrifice. The cenote at Punta Laguna has been extensively studied and none of the approximately 120 individuals show signs of sacrifice. 
The remains of this cultural heritage are protected by the UNESCO Convention on the Protection of the Underwater Cultural Heritage.

Scuba diving 

Cenotes have attracted cavern and cave divers, and there are organized efforts to explore and map these underwater systems. They are public or private and sometimes considered "National Natural Parks". Great care should be taken to avoid spoiling this fragile ecosystem when diving. In Mexico, the Quintana Roo Speleological Survey maintains a list of the longest and deepest water-filled and dry caves within the state boundaries. When cavern diving, one must be able to see natural light the entire time that one is exploring the cavern (e.g., Kukulkan cenote near Tulum, Mexico). During a cave dive, one passes the point where daylight can penetrate, and one follows a safety guideline to exit the cave. Things change quite dramatically once moving from a cavern dive into a cave dive. Too many divers, even experienced ones, have died for ignoring safety recommendations.

Contrary to cenote cavern diving, cenote cave diving requires special equipment and training (certification for cave diving). However, both cavern and cave diving require detailed briefings, diving experience, and weight adjustment to freshwater buoyancy. The cenotes are usually filled with rather cool fresh water. Cenote divers must be wary of possible halocline; this produces blurred vision until they reach a more homogeneous area.

Notable cenotes

Australia
 Ewens Ponds, near Mount Gambier, South Australia
Kilsby Sinkhole, near Mount Gambier, South Australia
Little Blue Lake, near Mount Schank, South Australia

Bahamas
 Thunderball Grotto, on Staniel Cay

Belize
 Great Blue Hole

Canada
 Devil's Bath is the largest cenote in Canada at a size of 1178 ft (359m) in diameter and 144 ft (44m) in depth. It is located near the village of Port Alice, British Columbia on the northwest coastline of Vancouver Island. Devil's Bath is continuously fed by an underground spring and is connected by underwater tunnel to the Benson River Cave.

Dominican Republic
 Hoyo Azul (Punta Cana)
 Los Tres Ojos
 Ojos Indigenas (Punta Cana)

Jamaica
 Blue Hole (Ocho Rios)

Mexico

Central and northern regions
 Zacatón, Tamaulipas

Yucatán Peninsula
 Dos Ojos, Municipality of Tulum
 Dzibilchaltun, Yucatán
 Ik Kil, Yucatan
 Gran Cenote, Municipality of Tulum
 Hubiku, Yucatan
 Sacred Cenote, Chichen Itza
 Xtacunbilxunan, Bolonchén
 Cenote Azul, Playa del Carmen
 Jardin Del Eden, Bacalar
 Choo-Ha, Coba
 Zaci, Valladolid
 El Zapote, the site of the Hells Bells bell-like rock formation

United States
 Blue Hole, Santa Rosa, New Mexico
 Blue Hole, Castalia, Ohio
 Bottomless Lakes, near Roswell, New Mexico
 Montezuma Well, Verde Valley, Arizona
 Hamilton Pool, Austin, Texas

Zimbabwe
 Chinhoyi Caves in Zimbabwe

See also

References

Citations

Other sources

External links 

 Cenotes of Chichén Itzá
 Doline, Sinkhole, Cenote
 Sistema Zacatón
 Stages in the Formation of a Cenote
 Volcanic karstification of Sistema Zacaton, Mexico (Gary, Sharp, 2006)
 Year 1999 Cenotes Conference in Perugia, Italy

Cave geology
Caves of Mexico
Geography of Yucatán
Karst caves
Locations in Maya mythology
Natural history of Mesoamerica
Cenote
Karst formations of Mexico